In geometry, the elongated triangular orthobicupola or cantellated triangular prism is one of the Johnson solids . As the name suggests, it can be constructed by elongating a triangular orthobicupola by inserting a hexagonal prism between its two halves. The resulting solid is superficially similar to the rhombicuboctahedron (one of the Archimedean solids), with the difference that it has threefold rotational symmetry about its axis instead of fourfold symmetry.

Volume 
The volume of J35 can be calculated as follows:

J35 consists of 2 cupolae and hexagonal prism.

The two cupolae makes 1 cuboctahedron = 8 tetrahedra + 6 half-octahedra.
1 octahedron = 4 tetrahedra, so total we have 20 tetrahedra.

What is the volume of a tetrahedron?
Construct a tetrahedron having vertices in common with alternate vertices of a
cube (of side , if tetrahedron has unit edges). The 4 triangular
pyramids left if the tetrahedron is removed from the cube form half an
octahedron = 2 tetrahedra. So

The hexagonal prism is more straightforward. The hexagon has area , so

Finally

numerical value:

Related polyhedra and honeycombs

The elongated triangular orthobicupola forms space-filling honeycombs with tetrahedra and square pyramids.

References

External links
 

Johnson solids